Alte Taverne is a traditional restaurant founded in 1595 and located in Bad Füssing, Bavaria, Germany.

The building contains tufts of the former Magdalenen church in Rotthalmünster and in the summer visitors can use the naturally-grown beer garden.

See also 
List of oldest companies

References

External links 
Homepage in German
Facebook page
Reviews on TripAdvisor.

Restaurants in Germany
Companies established in the 16th century
16th-century establishments in the Holy Roman Empire
Restaurants established in the 16th century